Issa Zongo (born 27 July 1980 in Abidjan) is a Burkinabé footballer. He played for ASFA Yennenga.

Career
Zongo previously played for Satellite FC Abidjan and signed in January 2004 with ASFA Yennenga.

International career
Zongo was part of the Burkinabé 2002 African Nations Cup team, who finished bottom of group B in the first round of competition, thus failing to secure qualification for the quarter-finals.

Clubs
2002-2004 Satellite FC du Plateau Abidjan
2004–present ASFA Yennenga

External links

1980 births
Living people
Association football midfielders
Citizens of Burkina Faso through descent
Burkinabé footballers
Burkina Faso international footballers
2002 African Cup of Nations players
ASFA Yennenga players
Ivorian footballers
Footballers from Abidjan
Ivorian people of Burkinabé descent
Sportspeople of Burkinabé descent
21st-century Burkinabé people